Journal of Molecular Structure is a scientific journal published by Elsevier ScienceDirect since 1968.  Its articles discuss molecular structure in chemistry.

After the 2022 Russian invasion of Ukraine it said that it would no longer consider manuscripts written by scientists at Russian institutions. Rui Fausto, the journal’s editor and a chemist at the University of Coimbra in Portugal, said: “Our decision will be in force until international legality is restored.”

See also 
 Journal of Molecular Structure: THEOCHEM

References

Chemistry journals
Elsevier academic journals
Molecular geometry
English-language journals
Publications established in 1968
Biweekly journals